Julie Lopes-Curval is a French film director, screenwriter, theatre director, and playwright. Her directorial debut Seaside was showcased in the Directors' Fortnight section at the 2002 Cannes Film Festival, where it won the Caméra d'Or.

Filmography

Plays
 Vitrines
 La Vitesse du passant

References

External links
 

Living people
French women film directors
French women screenwriters
French screenwriters
Cours Florent alumni
French theatre directors
French women dramatists and playwrights
French-language film directors
Year of birth missing (living people)
Directors of Caméra d'Or winners